Jeff Foster (born July 30, 1980) is an author and public speaker from England.

Biography
Foster was born in 1980 in London, England. He studied Astrophysics at Cambridge University. At the time he was overwhelmed by feelings of despair and loneliness, which eventually led to physical illness and a personal breakdown soon after graduation. He was convinced he was going to die. Foster returned to live with his parents, reading and studying for a year on spirituality, searching for relief from his depression. This ended in 2006 with the dissolution of the sense of separation, which he understood to be a spiritual awakening:

He wrote a book, Life Without a Centre (Non-Duality Press), and was invited to hold small gatherings. Eventually, after having written several more books, the gatherings were supplemented with retreats and one-to-one sessions.

In 2011, Foster wrote an article explaining why he no longer considered himself to be an "Advaita teacher" or "nonduality teacher," pointing out problems with the one-sidedness of contemporary "radical Advaita" teachings. Instead of a strict impersonal philosophy, he started to embrace and emphasise the relative, human, personal existence in his writings and gatherings, a relativity which he felt was not in conflict with the impersonal Absolute.

Works
 Life Without a Centre: Awakening from the Dream of Separation (2006)
 Beyond Awakening: The End of the Spiritual Search (2007)
 The Revelation of Oneness: Dialogues on Nonduality and Spiritual Awakening (2008)
 An Extraordinary Absence: Liberation in the Midst of a Very Ordinary Life (2009)
 The Wonder of Being: Awakening to an Intimacy Beyond Words (2010)
 The Deepest Acceptance: Radical Awakening in Ordinary Life (2012)
 Falling In Love With Where You Are: A Year of Prose And Poetry on Radically Opening Up To the Pain and Joy of Life (2013)
 The Way of Rest: Finding The Courage to Hold Everything in Love (2016)
 The Joy of True Meditation: Words of Encouragement for Tired Minds and Wild Hearts (2019)
 You Were Never Broken: Poems to Save Your Life (2020)

See also
 Neo-Advaita
 Bhedabheda
 Nondualism - Modern Madhyamaka
 Spiritual bypass

References

External links
 lifewithoutacentre.com
 Jeff Foster, The Advaita Trap, EnlightenNext Magazine

Neo-Advaita teachers
Spiritual teachers
1980 births
Living people